Feliks Oraczewski of Szreniawa coat of arms (14 January 1739 in Przybysławice – 12 August 1799 in Vienna) was a Polish writer, educational and political activist.

Feliks Oraczewski was a Member of the Polish Parliament from 1773-1775.

He participated in the Commission of National Education. He was also on the Apothecary Permanent Council from 1778-1780. Oraczewski was also a member of the Society for Elementary Books. From 1786-1790 he held the post of rector of the Academy of Kraków.

Orraczewski served as a Polish ambassador in Paris in 1791-1792.

Writing career
Felix Oraczewski also occasionally wrote poems. He also wrote comedies. His works in this genre include The Litigant (1775) and Playground, Or Life Without Purpose(1780).

Politics
In 1773, during a session of the parliament, Oraczewski put forth a proposal for the formation of a parliamentary delegation. His envisioned the mission of this delegation to develop a national education program. This proposal eventually led to the establishment of the National Education Commission.

In 1787, Oraczewski was made a Knight of the Order of Saint Stanislaus.

References

1739 births
1799 deaths
Polish male writers
18th-century Polish nobility
Polish diplomats
People from Kraków County